As of April 2022, Vietnam (officially the Socialist Republic of Vietnam) maintains diplomatic relationships with 192 nations throughout the world and the State of Palestine, including all UN member states and UN observer states other than (i) UN member states Malawi, Tonga and Tuvalu and (ii) the UN observer Holy See. In 2011 the Central Committee of the Communist Party of Vietnam, at the 11th National Congress of the Communist Party of Vietnam, released an official statement about Vietnam's foreign policy and a section of the statement stated: "Vietnam is a friend and reliable partner of all countries in the international community, actively taking part in international and regional cooperation processes. Deepen, stabilize and sustain established international relations. Develop relations with countries and territories in the world, as well as international organizations, while showing: respect for each other's independence; sovereignty and territorial integrity; non-interference in each other's international affairs; non-use or threat of force; settlement of disagreements and disputes by means of peaceful negotiations; mutual respect, equality and mutual benefit."

Major steps have been taken by Vietnam to restore diplomatic ties with key countries. Full diplomatic relations were restored with New Zealand who opened its embassy in Hanoi in 1995, while Vietnam established an embassy in Wellington in 2003. Pakistan reopened its embassy in Hanoi in October 2000. Vietnam also reopened its embassy in Islamabad in December 2005 and trade office in Karachi in November 2005. United States–Vietnam relations improved in August 1995, when both nations upgraded their liaison offices opened during January 1995 to embassy status, with the United States later opening a consulate general in Ho Chi Minh City, and Vietnam opening a consulate in San Francisco.

History

Feudal Vietnam
Vietnam has a history stretching back more than 4,000 years. In its early history, Vietnam tried to maintain good relations with its neighbours. From the Hồng Bàng dynasty to many feudal dynasties like the Ngô, Đinh, Early Lê, Lý, Trần, Later Lê, Tây Sơn and Nguyễn, Vietnam's main diplomatic relationships were with neighboring Imperial China, Kingdom of Champa, Khmer Empire, Lan Xang kingdom and Siam. Later trading relationship were established with European Countries (such as through Dutch East India company) and Japan.

Post-World War II
+ Period 1945-1946: After the surrender of Japan, Both British and Chinese Kuomintang armies came into Vietnam territory to take the Japanese imperial army out of Indochina. The government of Democratic Republic of Vietnam decided to have the peace agreement with Chiang Kai-shek of Kuomintang that stationed in the north Vietnam to let them pay attention to fight the French in the south. After that, Vietnam signed the peace treaty with France in 6/3/1946.
+ Period 1947-1954 : Vietnam started to expand their foreign relation with the other countries in the world. In January, 1950, the People's Republic of China and the Soviet Union were the first two countries to recognize the Democratic Republic of Vietnam. Later, alliances were formed with Cambodia and Laos to make anti-French campaigns, building the friendship with the anti-colonial countries such as Thailand, Myanmar, Indonesia and India.

Cold War Era

Vietnam War

During the Vietnam War (1959–75), North Vietnam balanced relations with its two major allies, the Soviet Union and the People's Republic of China.

In 1964, Zhou Enlai, worried about the escalation of U.S. forces in South Vietnam, made an informal agreement with the North. The agreement stipulated that if U.S. and South Vietnamese forces invaded North Vietnam, the Chinese would respond by loaning pilots to the North. During the invasion, Mao Zedong failed to send as many trained pilots as he promised. As a result, the North became more reliant on the Soviet Union for its defense.

By 1975, tension began to grow as Beijing increasingly viewed Vietnam as a potential Soviet instrument to encircle China. Meanwhile, Beijing's increasing support for Cambodia's Khmer Rouge sparked Vietnamese suspicions of China's motives.

Vietnamese-Chinese relations deteriorated significantly after Hanoi instituted a ban in March 1978 on private trade, a move that particularly affected the Sino-Vietnamese sector of the population. Following Vietnam's December 1978 invasion of Cambodia, China launched a retaliatory invasion of Vietnam's northern border region. Faced with severance of Chinese aid and strained international relations, Vietnam established even closer ties with the Soviet Union and its allies in the Comecon member states. Throughout the 1980s, Vietnam received nearly US$3 billion a year in economic and military aid from the Soviet Union and conducted most of its trade with the U.S.S.R. and Comecon countries. Soviet and Eastern bloc economic aid, however, ceased after the breakup of the Soviet Union.

Reform (Đổi Mới)
Vietnam didn't begin to emerge from international isolation until it withdrew its troops from Cambodia in 1989. Within months of the 1991 Paris Agreements, Vietnam established diplomatic and economic relations with Association of South-East Asian Nations (ASEAN) member states and also with most countries of Western Europe and Asia's Far East. China re-established full diplomatic ties with Vietnam in 1991. The two nations concluded a land border demarcation agreement in 1999. In 1995, the US and Vietnam re-established diplomatic ties.

In the past decade, Vietnam has recognized the importance of growing global economic interdependence and has made concerted efforts to adjust its foreign relations to reflect the evolving international economic and political situation in Southeast Asia. The country has begun to integrate itself into the regional and global economy by joining international organizations. Vietnam has stepped up its efforts to attract foreign capital from the West and regularize relations with the world financial system. In the 1990s, following the lifting of the US veto on multilateral loans to the country, Vietnam became a member of the World Bank, the International Monetary Fund (IMF), and the Asian Development Bank. The country has expanded trade with its East Asian neighbors as well as with countries in Western Europe and North America. Of particular significance was Vietnam's acceptance into ASEAN in July 1995. Vietnam joined the Asia-Pacific Economic Cooperation forum (APEC) in November 1998 and also hosted the ASEAN summit the following month. In 2005, Vietnam attended the inaugural East Asia Summit. Vietnam became a member of the World Trade Organization in November 2006.

Current issues

While Vietnam has remained relatively conflict-free since its Cambodia days, tensions have arisen in the past between Vietnam and its neighbors, especially in the case of China since both nations assert claims to the Spratly and Paracel Islands - the two archipelagos in a potentially oil-rich area of the South China Sea. Conflicting claims have produced over the years small scale armed altercations in the area. In 1988, more than 70 Vietnamese troops were killed during a confrontation with Chinese forces, when China occupied several islands under Vietnamese control in the Spratly Islands. China's assertion of control over the Spratly Islands and the entire South China Sea has elicited concern from Vietnam and its Southeast Asia neighbors. The territorial border between the two countries is being definitively mapped pursuant to a Land Border Agreement signed in December 1999, and an Agreement on Borders in the Gulf of Tonkin signed in December 2000. Vietnam and Russia declared a strategic partnership in March 2001 during the first visit ever to Hanoi of a Russian head of state, largely as an attempt to counterbalance China's growing profile in Southeast Asia.

Disputes – international: maritime boundary with Cambodia not defined; involved in a complex dispute over the Spratly - Paracel Islands with the People's Republic of China (PRC), Malaysia, Philippines, and possibly Brunei; maritime boundary with Thailand resolved in August 1997; maritime boundary dispute with the PRC in the Gulf of Tonkin resolved in 2000; Paracel Islands occupied by the PRC since 1974; offshore islands and sections of boundary with Cambodia are in dispute; agreement on land border with the People's Republic of China was signed in December 1999.

Illicit drugs: minor producer of opium poppy with 21 km2 cultivated in 1999, capable of producing 11 metric tons of opium; probably minor transit point for Southeast Asian heroin destined for the US and Europe; growing opium/heroin addiction; possible small-scale heroin production

International relations

Africa

Americas

Asia

Europe

Oceania

See also
 List of diplomatic missions in Vietnam
 List of diplomatic missions of Vietnam
 Visa requirements for Vietnamese citizens

References

Further reading
 Amer, Ramses. "Border conflicts between Cambodia and Vietnam." IBRU Boundary and Security Bulletin 5.2 (1997): 80-97 online.
 Asselin, Pierre. Vietnam's American War: A History. (Cambridge University Press, 2018)  online review
 Brown, Frederick Z. "Rapprochement Between Vietnam and the United States." Contemporary Southeast Asia (2010): 317-342 online.
 Cuong, Nguyen Xuan, and Nguyen Thi Phuong Hoa. "Achievements and Problems in Vietnam: China Relations from 1991 to the Present." China Report 54.3 (2018): 306-324. online
 Gin, Christopher M. "How China Wins: A Case Study of the 1979 Sino-Vietnamese War" (Army Command And General Staff College Fort Leavenworth KS, 2015) online.
 Ha, Lam Thanh, and Nguyen Duc Phuc. "The US-China Trade War: Impact on Vietnam." (2019). online
 Hiep, Nguyen Quang. "Vietnam-China trade relations and the effects of the US-China trade war." Business and Economic Research 9.4 (2019): 1-11.

 Hood, Steven J. Dragons Entangled: Indochina and the China-Vietnam War (ME Sharpe, 1993).
 Leighton, Marian Kirsch. "Perspectives on the Vietnam-Cambodia border conflict." Asian Survey 18.5 (1978): 448–457. online
 Levinson, David, and Karen Christensen, eds. Encyclopedia of Modern Asia. (2002) vol 6.
 Morris, Stephen J. Why Vietnam invaded Cambodia: Political culture and the causes of war (Stanford University Press, 1999).
 Path, Kosal. "The Duality of Vietnam’s Deference and Resistance to China." Diplomacy & Statecraft 29.3 (2018): 499–521. online
 Thanh, Luong Ngoc. "Vietnam's Foreign Policy in the post-Cold War Era: Ideology and Reality." (PhD dissertation Hiroshima University 2013) online.
 Thayer, Carlyle A. "Vietnam in 2013: Domestic contestation and foreign policy success." Southeast Asian Affairs (2014): 355-372  online.
 Tran, Thi Bich, and Yoichiro Sato. "Vietnam's Post‐Cold War Hedging Strategy: A Changing Mix of Realist and Liberal Ingredients." Asian Politics & Policy 10.1 (2018): 73-99 online.
 Vuving, Alexander L. "Strategy and evolution of Vietnam's China policy: a changing mixture of pathways." Asian Survey 46.6 (2006): 805-824 online
 Westad, Odd Arne, and Sophie Quinn-Judge, eds. The third Indochina war: conflict between China, Vietnam and Cambodia, 1972-79 (Routledge, 2006).
 Womack, Brantly. "Asymmetry and systemic misperception: China, Vietnam and Cambodia during the 1970s." Journal of Strategic Studies 26.2 (2003): 92-119 online.

External links
 
 Vietnam – US trade